Edda Magnason is Edda Magnason's debut album.

It was recorded at Nybrokajen 11 in Stockholm, the oldest venue in Sweden for classical music concerts. Magnason wrote the music, played piano and sang. She produced the record together with Jonas André and made all the illustrations for the CD booklet.

The other musicians were Tomas Ebrelius (violin, glockenspiel), Martin Eriksson (double bass), Nils Berg (flute, clarinet), Jonas André (keyboard, bass guitar) och Emeli André (vocals).

Track list 
"Swirl" - 3:30
"Ropewalking" - 4:10 
"Drömde jag var hund" - 1:54 
"Ali" - 3:29 
"Playbird" - 1:43 
"Snow" - 3:45 
"The blue hour" - 2:11 
"Niece" - 2:55 
"Patience" - 1:06
"Boats" - 6:37 
"Sweet and sour" - 3:29 
"Emmigrants" - 3:56 
"Goodbye song" - 2:53

References

2010 debut albums
Edda Magnason albums